A  (Sephardic: ,; plural  ) is an organizational element of Talmudic literature that systematically examines a subject, referred to as a tractate in English.

  A tractate/ consists of chapters (singular:   or ).

Etymology
The word masakhet appears in the Hebrew Bible denoting web or texture. The plain Hebrew meaning of the word is a framework of warp and weft used in weaving. It also refers to a work of in-depth examination of a topic comprising a framework of discussions, research and conclusions. It refers in particular to the sections of the Mishnah, Tosefta, Beraita, and Gemara of the Babylonian and Jerusalem Talmuds.

Usage

The "major" tractates, which are those of the Mishnah itself, are organized into six groups, called sedarim, while the minor tractates, which were not canonized in the Mishnah, stand alone.

The Mishnah comprises sixty-three tractates, each of which is divided into chapters and paragraphs. The same applies to the Tosefta. Each masekhet or tractate is named after the principal subject with which it deals, for example, Masekhet Berakhoth, Masekhet Shabbath, or Masekhet Sanhedrin. The Aramaic word masekhta (מסכתא) is used interchangeably with the Hebrew word masekhet. 

The following are the tractates of the Mishnah, in the six divisions known as Sedarim (Orders):

The Babylonian Talmud has Gemara—rabbinical analysis of and commentary on the Mishnah—on thirty-seven masekhtot; the Jerusalem Talmud has Gemara on thirty-nine masekhtot. 

There are fifteen Minor Masekhtot. They are usually printed at the end of Seder Nezikin in the Talmud. They contain diverse subjects such as Aggadah including folklore, historical anecdotes, moral exhortations, and practical advice in various spheres, laws and customs pertaining to death and mourning, engagement, marriage and co-habitation, deportment, manners and behavior, maxims urging self-examination and modesty, the ways of peace between people, regulations for writing Torah scrolls and the Mezuzah, Tefillin and for making Tzitzit, as well as conversion to Judaism. 

Rabbinic literature which expounds upon such Talmudic literature may organize itself similarly (e.g. the Halachot by Alfasi), but many works follow a different structure (e.g. Mishneh Torah by Maimonides). Non-Mishnaic literature, such as Midrash, even when from the Mishnaic-era, is not organized into tractates.

References

Minor tractates
Mishnah
Oral Torah
Rabbinic literature
Talmud